Agonopterix stigmella is a moth in the family Depressariidae. It was described by Frederic Moore in 1878. It is found in eastern Turkmenistan.

References

Moths described in 1878
Agonopterix
Moths of Asia